Grynet is a Swedish fictional character, an alter ego similar to fellow Scandinavian personality Silvía Night, portrayed by Elin Ek.

Personality 
Creator Elin Ek says that the character of Grynet just popped out of her head as an idea one day to do a character based on the typical Swedish teenager. Grynet loves everything pink and has her mantra "Don't take any shit from others".

Grynets Show 
On Grynets Show on Sveriges Television (SVT), she meets Swedish stars like Zlatan Ibrahimović and the members of A*Teens and shares craft projects that viewers can make on their own like applying a new design on handbags with glitter.

The Grynets Show is SVT's highest rated shows for kids ever.

References

External links
Grynets Show homepage

Fictional interviewers
Fictional reporters

sv:Elin Ek (programledare)#Grynet